Eunique Jones Gibson is the founder and publisher of Because of Them We Can™, CEO of Culture Brands and a photographer, and an author and activist. She became known for creating the "Because of Them, We Can™" campaign.

Early life and education
Eunique Jones Gibson was born in Washington, DC and grew up in Maryland. She majored in communications at the Bowie State University. After graduating, Gibson accepted a position in online advertising with Microsoft in New York City.

Career

In September 2014, Eunique introduced a new project "Por Ellos, Sí Podemos" with the start of National Hispanic Heritage Month.

In 2013, Gibson created and launched the Because of Them, We Can™ campaign during Black History Month. Inspired by her own sons, the photo campaign included photos of children dressed as historical Black icons. Because the campaign went viral, Eunique left her job to focus on the campaign and grow the movement. Due to her work, she received a post to the Arts Advisory Board under the White House Initiative on Educational Excellence for African Americans.

In February 2012, Gibson also created the photo awareness campaign "I AM Trayvon Martin" after the death of Trayvon Martin to highlight the need for racial justice.

Awards and honors
2018: Webby Award honoree 
2015: 40 Under 40 Award from the Prince George's County Social Innovation Fund
2014: White House Champion of Change for the Because of Them, We Can™ campaign

References

External links
 
 Because of Them, We Can
 Instagram
 Twitter

Year of birth missing (living people)
Living people
21st-century American women writers
Bowie State University alumni
Activists from Washington, D.C.
Activists from Maryland
Microsoft people
21st-century American writers
21st-century American photographers
Writers from Maryland
Writers from Washington, D.C.
Photographers from Maryland
Photographers from Washington, D.C.
21st-century American women photographers